Haplogroup R2a, or haplogroup R-M124, is a Y-chromosome haplogroup characterized by genetic markers M124, P249, P267, L266, and is mainly found in South Asia as well as in Central Asia, Caucasus, Southwest Asia, and the Arab countries with low frequencies.

Term history
Haplogroup R2a is also known as haplogroup R-M124. The first reference to the newly defined haplogroup, "R-M124", was on 25 August 2010.
 
Before the publication of the 2005 Y-Chromosome Phylogenetic Tree, Haplogroup R-M124 was known as Haplogroup P1 and formerly thought to be a sister clade of Haplogroup R rather than derived from it.

Haplogroup R2 most often observed in Asia, especially on the Indian sub-continent and Central Asia. It is also reported at notable frequencies in Caucasus.

Origins
uncertainty neutralizes previous conclusions that the intrusion of HGs R1a1 and R2 [Now R-M124] from the northwest in Dravidian-speaking southern tribes is attributable to a single recent event. Rather, these HGs contain considerable demographic complexity, as implied by their high haplotype diversity. Specifically, they could have actually arrived in southern India from a southwestern Asian source region multiple times, with some episodes considerably earlier than others.

Subclades

Paragroup R-M124* 
Paragroup is a term used in population genetics to describe lineages within a haplogroup that are not defined by any additional unique markers. They are typically represented by an asterisk (*) placed after the main haplogroup.

Y-chromosomes which are positive to the M124, P249, P267, and L266 SNPs and negative to the L295, L263, and L1069 SNPs, are categorized as belonging to Paragroup R-M124*. It is found in Iraq, so far.

Haplogroup R-L295 

Haplogroup R-L295 is a Y-chromosome haplogroup characterized by genetic marker L295. It is found in South Asia, Anatolia, Arabian Peninsula, Europe, & Central Asia so far.

Haplogroup R-L263 

Haplogroup R-L263 is a Y-chromosome haplogroup characterized by genetic marker L263. It is found in Greek Asia Minor & Armenia so far.

Haplogroup R-L1069 

Haplogroup R-L1069 is a Y-chromosome haplogroup characterized by genetic marker L1069. It is found in Kuwait so far.

Distribution
R-M124 is most often observed in Asia, especially on the Indian sub-continent and in Central Asia It is also reported at notable frequencies in Caucasus.

Historical
Ancient samples of haplogroup R2a were observed in the remains of humans from Neolithic, Chalcolithic and Bronze Age Iran and Turan; and Iron Age South Asia. R2a was also recovered from excavated remains in the South Asian sites of Saidu Sharif and Butkara from a later period.

South Asia

Haplogroup R-M124, along with haplogroups H, L, R1a1, and J2, forms the majority of the South Asian male population.  The frequency is around 10-15% in India and Sri Lanka and 7-8% in Pakistan. Its spread within South Asia is very extensive, ranging from Baluchistan in the west to Bengal in the east; Hunza in the north to Sri Lanka in the south.

India 
Among regional groups, it is found among West Bengalis (23%), New Delhi Hindus (20%), Punjabis (5%) and Gujaratis (3%).
Among tribal groups, Karmalis of West Bengal showed highest at 100% (16/16) followed by Lodhas (43%) to the east, while Bhil of Gujarat in the west were at 18%, Tharus of north showed it at 17%, Chenchu and Pallan of south were at 20% and 14% respectively.  Among caste groups, high percentages are shown by Jaunpur Kshatriyas (87%), Kamma Chaudhary (73%), Bihar Yadav (50%), Khandayat (46%)and Kallar (44%).

It is also significantly high in many Brahmin groups including Punjabi Brahmins (25%), Bengali Brahmins (22%), Konkanastha Brahmins (20%), Chaturvedis (32%), Bhargavas (32%), Kashmiri Pandits (14%) and Lingayat Brahmins (30%).

North Indian Muslims have a frequency of 19% (Sunni) and 13% (Shia), while Dawoodi Bohra Muslim in the western state of Gujarat have a frequency of 16% and Mappila Muslims of South India have a frequency of 5%.

Pakistan 
The R2 haplogroup in the northern regions of Pakistan is found among Burusho people (14%), Pashtuns (10%) and Hazaras (4%).

In southern regions, it is found among Balochis (12%), Brahuis (12%) and Sindhi (5%).

Sri Lanka 
38% of the Sinhalese of Sri Lanka were found to be R2 positive according to a 2003 research.

Central Asia

In Kazakh tribes it varies from 1% to 12%, however it is found at a higher percent at about 25% among Tore Tribe / Genghis Khans descendant tribe.

In Central Asia, Tajikistan shows Haplogroup R-M124 at 6%, while the other '-stan' states vary around 2%. Bartangis of Tajikistan have a high frequency of R-M124 at about 17%, Ishkashimi at 8%, Khojant at 9% and Dushanbe at 6%.

Specifically, Haplogroup R-M124 has been found in approximately 7.5% (4/53) of recent Iranian emigrants living in Samarkand, 7.1% (7/99) of Pamiris, 6.8% (3/44) of Karakalpaks, 5.1% (4/78) of Tajiks, 5% (2/40) of Dungans in Kyrgyzstan, 3.3% (1/30) of Turkmens, 2.2% (8/366) of Uzbeks, and 1.9% (1/54) of Kazakhs.

East Asia
A 2011 genetic study found R-M124 in 6.7% of Han Chinese from western Henan, 3.4% of Han Chinese from Gansu and 2.1% to 4.2% of Uyghurs from Xinjiang.

In a 2014 paper, R-M124 has been detected in 0.9% (1/110) of Han Chinese samples from China. The sample belonged to an individual from Jilin province.

West Asia
The haplogroup R-M124 frequency of 6.1% (6/114) was found among overall Kurds while in one study which was done with 25 samples of Kurmanji Kurds from Georgia, R-M124 has been observed at 44% (11/25)

In Caucasus high frequency was observed in Armenians from Sason at 18% (18/104) while it was observed at %1 in Armenians from Van. R2 has been found in Chechens at 16%. R-M124 has been found in approximately 8% (2/24) of a sample of Ossetians from Alagir.

In the Caucasus, around 16% of Mountain Jews, 8% of Balkarians, 6% of Kalmyks, 3% of Azerbaijanis, 2.6% of Kumyks, 2.4% of Avars, 2% of Armenians, and 1% to 6% of Georgians belong to the R-M124 haplogroup. Approximately 1% of Turks and 1% to 3% of Iranians also belong to this haplogroup.

In Iran R-M124 follows a similar distribution as R1a1 with higher percentages in the southeastern Iran. It has been found at Frequencies of 9.1% at Isfahan, 6.9% at Hormozgan and 4.2% in Mazandaran.

Arab World

In the R2-M124-WTY and R-Arabia Y-DNA Projects, Haplogroup R-M124 has appeared in the following Arab countries: Kuwait (3 clusters),  United Arab Emirates (1 cluster), Syrian Arab Republic (1 cluster), and Tunisia (1 cluster).

Thus, Haplogroup R-M124 has been observed among Arabs at low frequencies in 11 countries/territories (Egypt, Jordan, Kuwait, Lebanon, Palestine, Qatar, Syria, Tunisia, United Arab Emirates, and Yemen) of the 22 Arab countries/territories so far.  
In the Kingdom of Saudi Arabia so far has one family identified to have Haplogroup R2A (R-M124) of its paternal genome or Y-Chromosome updated 5 January; 2018.

Position on the ISOGG tree and related SNPs 

Haplogroup R-M124 is a subgroup of Haplogroup R-M479 (M479):
   R-M479 (M479)
  R-M124 (M124, P249, P267, L266)
 R-L295 (L295)
 R-L263 (L263)
 R-L1069 (L1069)

Prediction with haplotypes

Haplotype can be used to predict haplogroup.  The chances of any person part of this haplogroup is the highest if DYS391=10, DYS392=10 and DYS426=12.

See also 
Genetics and Archaeogenetics of South Asia: R1a1 and R2
Genealogical DNA test

Y-DNA R-M207 subclades

Y-DNA backbone tree

Notes

References 

 .

External links 
 Spread of R2
 The India Genealogical DNA Project
 R2 Y-Chromosome Haplogroup DNA Project
 Digging into Haplogroup R2 (Y-DNA)
 R2-M124-WTY (Walk Through the Y) Project
 R-Arabia Y-DNA Project
 List of R2 frequency

R-M124
R